Orthocarbonic acid, carbon hydroxide or methanetetrol is the name given to a hypothetical compound with the chemical formula  or . Its molecular structure consists of a single carbon atom bonded to four hydroxy groups.  It would be therefore a fourfold alcohol.  In theory it could lose four protons to give the hypothetical oxocarbon anion orthocarbonate , and is therefore considered an oxoacid of carbon. The compound has also been given the nickname of "Hitler's Acid" due to the Ball-and-stick model of the compound resembling the Swastika symbol.

Orthocarbonic acid is highly unstable. Calculations show that it decomposes spontaneously into carbonic acid and water:
 H4CO4 -> H2CO3 + H2O
Orthocarbonic acid is one of the group of ortho acids that have the general structure of .The term ortho acid is also used to refer to the most hydroxylated acid in a set of oxoacids.

Researchers predict that orthocarbonic acid is stable at high pressure; hence it may form in the interior of the ice giant planets Uranus and Neptune, where water and methane are common.

Orthocarbonate anions

Strontium orthocarbonate, is stable at atmospheric pressure. Orthocarbonate is tetrahedral in shape. The C-O distance is 1.41 Å.  is an oxide orthocarbonate, also stable at atmospheric pressure.

Orthocarbonate esters
The tetravalent moiety CO4 is found in stable organic compounds; they are formally esters of orthocarbonic acid, and therefore are called orthocarbonates. For example, tetraethoxymethane can be prepared by the reaction between chloropicrin and sodium ethoxide in ethanol. Polyorthocarbonates are stable polymers that might have applications in absorbing organic solvents in waste treatment processes, or in dental restorative materials. The explosive trinitroethylorthocarbonate possesses an orthocarbonate core.

See also
 Pentaerythritol
 Silicic acid or 
 Carbonic acid or

References

Hypothetical chemical compounds
Oxoacids
Tetrols
Hydroxides